Jane Priestman OBE (7 April 1930 – 25 January 2021) was a British designer who performed a number of high-profile roles in design and architecture. She was appointed an OBE in 1991 for her work in design and an honorary doctorate from Sheffield Hallam University in 1998.

Background
She was the daughter of Reuben Stanley Herbert and Mary Elizabeth Ramply. She married Arthur Martin Priestman in 1954. She was educated at Northwood College and Liverpool College of Art. At the Liverpool College of Art, Priestman was trained as a textile designer, as opposed to architecture. Her interest in architecture, led her to become even more interested in interior design. She relocated to Australia in 1951, with her loom by her side, in hopes of launching a career in the textile industry. Priestman quickly realised that the textile industry, for her, was short lived. Before getting her career started, she balanced raising a family, and doing freelance work for clients.

Career

Priestman qualified as an interior designer. Priestman ran her own design practice in the mid-1950s and became extremely successful in that for about 20 years. She began this business shortly after graduating university.

She subsequently became General Manager in Architecture and Design for the British Airport Authority from 1975 to 1986 and then Director of Architecture, Design and Environment for British Rail from 1986 to 1991. Her goal while doing so, was to expand upon what attitude the buildings portrayed when guests walked in. This is where her skills shined the most, because this led her to be one of the most reputable designers. Collaboration was the way Priestman taught other designers to work. Being a mentor to young designers, Jane Priestman was able to become an influential piece of the design world.

She spent 18 years, until 2010, as chair of Open City (the organisation behind Open House). She also became an Enabler, in 2001, for the Commission for Architecture and the Built Environment (CABE).

Priestman is credited for opening doors for women all over the UK, and potentially the world. Her accomplishments in design, and her authority that she was able to hold, gave women a higher standard than what they were perceived as during that time. This is extremely significant, because Priestman had no management training or experience in her field. She was able to successfully perform her duties with excellence, in the way any man could. Her portfolio consisted of over 2,800 stations that she completed during her entire career.

She was shortlisted for the Jane Drew Prize in 1998, for inclusiveness in architecture.

She died on 25 January 2021 at the age of 90.

Awards and Accomplishments 
Jane Priestman, due to her successes with her career, was recognized with many prestigious awards. In 1985, Priestman was officially recognized as an honorary member of the Royal Institute of British Architects (RIBA). She was also awarded the Ada Louise Huxtable Prize award in 2015 for her accomplishments in design. She won this at age 85, because she had the vision that architecture could change lives. Priestman accomplished recognition and control and prestige in the design community, for women in specifics. Current and future generations are able to be seen differently due to the work that Jane Priestman accomplished.

References
7. Wilcock, Richard. "Profile: An Outsider Bent on Reform." The Architects' Journal (Archive : 1919-2005) 199.8 (1994): 18–9. ProQuest. Web. 29 Nov. 2017.
8. “Jane Priestman: 'I Could Deliver HS2 with My Eyes Shut'.” Architects Journal, 27 Feb. 2015

9. Pearman, Hugh. “BR's Renaissance on the Right Track; Jane Priestman; Profile.” The Sunday Times (London), 11 June 1989.
10. “'Visionary' Pioneer Jane Priestman Wins Ada Louise Huxtable Prize.” Architects Journal, 5 Feb. 2015.

1930 births
2021 deaths
British interior designers
Officers of the Order of the British Empire
British railway architects
British Rail people
Alumni of Liverpool College of Art
People educated at Northwood College